Marcolin is a surname. Notable people with this surname include:

 Dario Marcolin (b. 1971),  Italian football coach and former football player
 Bror Jan Alfredo Marcolin, also known as Messiah Marcolin (b. 1967), vocalist of the doom metal band Candlemass

Surnames of Italian origin